Pomaderris aurea is a species of flowering plant in the family Rhamnaceae and is endemic to Victoria, Australia. It is a shrub with hairy branchlets, egg-shaped or elliptic leaves and panicles of golden yellow flowers.

Description
Flowering occurs from September to October.

Taxonomy
Pomaderris aurea was first formally described in 1951 by Norman Arthur Wakefield in The Victorian Naturalist from specimens he collected near the upper Genoa River in 1949. The specific epithet (aurea) means "golden".

Distribution and habitat
This pomaderris grows in forest and woodland in the north and east of Victoria.

Use in horticulture
Pomaderris aurea can be propagated from seed, although the seed is difficult to collect, or from cuttings, although usually very slow to strike. The species is floriferous, has attractive foliage, grows well in full sun in well-drained soil, and is at least moderately frost-tolerant.

References

aurea
Flora of Victoria (Australia)
Taxa named by Norman Arthur Wakefield
Plants described in 1951